Paul Laffoley (August 14, 1935 – November 16, 2015) was an American visionary artist and architect from Boston, Massachusetts.

Biography
Paul Laffoley was born on August 14, 1935, in Cambridge, Massachusetts, to an Irish Catholic family.  His father, Paul Laffoley, Sr., was president of the Cambridge Trust Company, and a lawyer who taught classes at Harvard Business School.  The elder Laffoley indoctrinated Paul, Jr. with his own religious philosophical beliefs, including aspects of Buddhism and Hinduism and what he called "mind-physics", but opposed Laffoley's pursuit of painting as a career. Laffoley, Sr. also taught Paul that there was "no gravity".

Laffoley wrote that his first spoken word was "Constantinople" at the age of six months. He did not speak again until he was four years old. He was diagnosed as having Asperger's Syndrome, scoring both high and low academically. According to Laffoley, he attended the progressive Mary Lee Burbank School in Belmont, Massachusetts, where his talent as a draftsman was ridiculed by his abstract expressionist teachers. After further studies at the Waldorf School, Laffoley would complete undergraduate studies at Brown University, graduating in 1961 with honors in classics, philosophy, and art history.  While at Brown in 1961, according to his "Phenomenology of Revelation", Laffoley was given eight electroshock treatments after the termination of "about a year of weekly sessions with a psychiatrist, who had treated [him] for a mild state of catatonia" 

In 1961, he enrolled at the Harvard Graduate School of Design, where he studied architecture because it consisted of diagrams that rendered objects in space with accuracy and precision. He also studied sculpture at Harvard's Carpenter Center with Mirko Basaldella whom he cited as an early influence. After one year, he was summarily expelled from GSD by the faculty for being "overly involved in his work". By chance, Laffoley was given an issue of Progressive Architecture by his uncle with Frederick Kiesler on the cover. Laffoley felt Kiesler's work was what he had been searching for and, after writing 17 letters, Laffoley went to New York and successfully entered an apprenticeship with Kiesler  While canvasing the art scene in New York, Laffoley met Andy Warhol, who offered him a place to sleep at his 87th Street fire station if he would report on late night television between 1 and 5 am. It was from watching these Indian Head Test Patterns, along with his early exposure to a Hindu tutor, that Laffoley would arrive at a format for his large scale paintings that would dominate his work for five decades. On weekdays during this period, Laffoley found employment with Emery Roth & Sons where he worked on the plans for the yet to be built World Trade Center Towers before being terminated upon his suggestion of bridges joining the two buildings.

After the death of his father in 1963, Laffoley returned to Boston and eventually established his first dedicated studio space, at 36 Bromfield Street, on Christmas Day, 1968.  It was there that Paul's career began to "connect" with an early show at the Orson Welles Theater, which was "hijacked" and taken to the Woodstock Music Festival for presentation by Dean Gitter, without Laffoley's permission.  In an effort to recover his work, Paul took the bus to Woodstock, which exposed him to the then-current countercultures of the day. This was followed by numerous exhibition opportunities and curatorial projects that lead to the creation of his Boston Visionary Cell (1971).  The Boston Visionary Cell, which Paul Laffoley founded on the model of an artists' guild, was a highly communal and curatorial undertaking. The charter of the Boston Visionary Cell underscores Laffoley's thought processes "to develop and advance visionary art".

By the late 1980s, Laffoley began to evolve from the spiritual and the intellectual to the view of his work as an interactive, physically engaging psychotronic device, perhaps similar to architectural monuments such as Stonehenge or the Cathedral of Notre Dame and their spiritual aura.  Works such as Thanaton III (1989), The Orgone Motor (1983), and the Geochronmechane: The Time Machine from Earth (1990) followed this concept.

After the destruction of the World Trade Center towers on September 11, 2001, Laffoley was one of a number of architects who, in 2002, submitted designs for the competition to plan the Freedom Tower. Laffoley took his inspiration from the work of Catalan architect Antoni Gaudí. His conception was to plan a gigantic hotel in the style of Gaudí's Sagrada Família church in Barcelona.

After the Austin Museum of Art organized a traveling survey of his career in 1999, Mr. Laffoley became something of a cult figure for curators around the world. The Palais de Tokyo in Paris devoted an entire room to his work in its 2009 exhibition "Chasing Napoleon", and several of his works were included in "The Alternative Guide to the Universe" at the Hayward Gallery in London in 2013. Other major shows include Premonitions of the Bauharoque at the Henry Art Gallery, Seattle (publication), Secret Garden at the Hamburger Bahnhof, Berlin (publication), and the recent monograph entitled The Essential Paul Laffoley edited by Douglas Walla and published by the University of Chicago Press in Spring 2016.

In 2001, Laffoley was badly injured in a fall. Complications from diabetes led to his right leg being amputated below the knee; at Laffoley's request, Stan Winston made him a custom prosthetic which resembled a lion's paw (because Laffoley was a Leo).

About
Following his formal education in the classics at Brown and architectural studies at Harvard, Laffoley began to assimilate and systematically cross-pollinate his related strands of intellectual inquiry. In a search for expanded opportunities, he went to New York in 1963 to work with the visionary artist and architect Frederick Kiesler, and was also recruited to view late-night TV for Andy Warhol in exchange for a place to sleep. 

At that time, Laffoley had been painting in the basement of his family home in Belmont on the weekends, completing his first fully mature vision: The Kali-Yuga: The End of the Universe at 424826 A.D. From this point forward, Laffoley began to formulate his unique trans-disciplinary approach to a new discipline combining, philosophy, science, architecture and spirituality to the practice of painting. Laffoley first began to organize his ideas in a format related to eastern mandalas, partially inspired by the late night patterns he watched for Warhol on late night television. This quickly developed into four general subcategories of paintings: operating systems, psychotronic devices, meta-energy, time travel, and lucid dreaming. Conceived of as "structured singularities", Laffoley never works in series, but rather approaches each project as a unique schematic. Working in a solitary lifestyle, each 73 ½ x 73 ½ inch canvas would take up to three years to paint and code. By the late 1980s, Laffoley began to move from the spiritual and the intellectual, to the view of his work as an interactive, physically engaging psychotronic device, a modern approach to trans-disciplinary enlightenment and its spiritual aura.

From an early age, Laffoley manifested an obsessive interest in UFOs. He had seen the movie The Day the Earth Stood Still 873 times. He explains that his obsessive interest in the film derives partly from a fascination with the architecture of the space ship in the film which, early on in his life, was subconscious. While he was still a child he made a vow to become an architect so that he could design flying saucers, although he did not become a registered architect until he was 50 years of age.

Work
Painted on large canvases, the majority of Paul Laffoley's paintings, combine words and imagery to depict a spiritual architecture of explanation that addressed concepts like dimensionality, time travel (through 'hacking' relativity), connection of conceptual threads shared by philosophers through the millennia, and theories about the cosmic origins of mankind.

Laffoley's writings as well as works of art were published in May 2016 by the University of Chicago Press in a new book entitled The Essential Paul Laffoley edited and texts by Douglas Walla, with further texts by Linda Dalywimple Henderson, Arielle Saiber and Steven Moskowitz.

British writer Michael Bracewell, in his collection of essays entitled When Surface was Depth observed: "If Laffoley's work within the Boston Visionary Cell can be said to have one principal preoccupation - a common denominator of his eclectic scholarship and practice - then that preoccupation would be to understand the process by which one goes from becoming to being." Bracewell has also written that, "The Boston Visionary Cell, as a concretized manifestation of its inhabitant's work and preoccupations, describes the way in which a chaos of data - no less than a chaos of marble - can be sculpted by research to release the perfect forms within it."

The Estate of Paul Laffoley is represented by Kent Fine Art in New York.

Death
Laffoley died on November 16, 2015, in South Boston, Massachusetts, of congestive heart failure.

Exhibitions
 The Force Structure of the Mystical Experience. New York: Kent Fine Art, 2015.
 Chasing Napoleon.  Paris: Palais de Tokyo, 2009. 
 Architectonic Thought-Forms: Gedankenexperiemente in Zombe Aesthetics.  A Survey of the Visionary Art of Paul Laffoley.  Texas: Austin Museum of Art, 1999.
 Paul Laffoley: Secret Universe.  Berlin: Hamburger Bahnhof, 2012.
 The Alternative Guide to the Universe.  London: Hayward Gallery, 2013.
 Paul Laffoley: The Boston Visionary Cell.  New York: Kent Fine Art, 2013.
 Paul Laffoley: Premonitions of the Bauharoque.  Seattle: Henry Art Gallery, 2013.

Major works
 The Kali-Yuga: the End of the Universe at 424826 A.D. (1965)
 The Cosmos Falls into the Chaos as Shakti Urborosi: The Elimination of Value Systems by Spectrum Analysis (1965)
 The Ecstasy of Revulsion (1966)
 The World Self (1967)
 I, Robur, Master of the World (1968)
 The Visionary Art Process (1969)
 The Final Descent From Hyparxis (1970)
 The Promethean Sinner (1970)
 The Visionary Point (1970)
 Utopia: Time Cast As A Voyage (1974)
 Alchemy: The Telenomic Process of the Universe (1974)
 Temporality: The Great Within of the Universe (1974)
 The Visionary Artist’s Studio (1974)
 Get Thee Behind Me, Satan (1974–1983)
 The Third Living Creature (1975)    
 The Kyklos of Hermocrates (1975)
 Black-White Hole: the Force of the History of the Universe to Produce Total Non-Existence (1976)
 The Secret of Life Lies in Death (1976)
 The Living Klein Bottle House of Time (1976)
 The Comet Kohoutek (1976)
 The Renovation Mundi (1977)
 A Proposal For A Pinball Museum (1978)
 Cosmolux (1981)
 The Orgone Motor (1982)
 Color Breathing (1983)
 Thanaton III (1989)
 Geochronmechane: The Time Machine from the Earth (1990)
 It Came From Beneath Space: Lucid Dream Number 52 (1991)
 The Solitron (1997)
 Dimensionality: The Manifestation of Fate (1999)
 After Gaudi: A Grand Hotel for New York City (2002)
 Pickman's Mephitic Models (2004)
 The Myth of the Zeit-Geist (2013)

Books and monographs
 Laffoley, Paul, edited and texts by Douglas Walla, with essays by Linda Dalrymple Henderson, Arielle Saiber and Steve Moskowitz. "The Essential Paul Laffoley" Chicago: The University of Chicago Press. 2016
 Laffoley, Paul, and Jeanne M. Wasilik. "The Phenomenology of Revelation". New York: Kent Fine Art, 1989. 
 Laffoley, P. (1999). Architectonic Thought Forms: a Survey of the Art of Paul Laffoley 1967–1999. Austin, TX: Austin Museum of Fine Art.
 Paul Laffoley: Secret Universe. Walther König, Köln, 2012.  (catalog)
 Croquer, Luis. (2013) "Paul Laffoley: Premonitions of the Bauharoque". Seattle: Henry Art Gallery. 
 Laffoley, Paul. (2016) "The Essential Paul Laffoley: Works from the Boston Visionary Cell." Chicago: University of Chicago Press.

Interviews
The Viking Youth Power Hour interview Paul at the Esozone, August 11, 2007
February 12, 2007. 3 hour interview on Mike Hagan's "RadiOrbit" show. Very broad range of topics covered including Laffoley's early life, working on the World Trade Center in the 1970s, developing his time travel theories, the Raelians, Buckminster Fuller, nanotechnology, living architecture and 2012. Link to archived MP3 stream of full 3 hour interview:
2001 Thanaton III produced for Channel 4. (original broadcast January 28, 2001. Interviewed by Richard Metzger)
1999 Pseudo.com Online Network interview with Richard Metzger of The Disinformation Company
1998 The Mystery of Genius (two part series) for the Arts & Entertainment Channel produced by Robert Fiveson. (broadcast in 1999). interviewed by John Metherell
1997 Paul Laffoley on the Time Machine, Strange Universe (original broadcast September 10, 1997). interviewed by Alisyn Camerota

Notable public collections
 Addison Gallery of American Art, Andover, MA
 Austin Museum of Art, Austin, TX
 Brockton Museum of Art, Brockton, MA
 Continental Can Corporation, NY
 First National Bank of Chicago, Chicago, IL
 Grand Rapids Art Museum, Grand Rapids, MI
 Hirshhorn Museum and Sculpture Garden, Washington D.C.
 Museum of Fine Arts, Boston, MA
 Ruth and Marvin Sackner Archive of Concrete and Visual Poetry, Miami, FL
 Tufts New England Medical Center, Boston, MA
 American Visionary Art Museum, Baltimore, MD
 American Folk Art Museum, New York, NY 
 deCordova Sculpture Park and Museum, Lincoln, MA 
 Henry Art Gallery, Seattle, WA

References

External links
  The Estate of Paul Laffoley and Kent Fine Art
  Paul Laffoley: The Boston Visionary Cell 2013 pdf
  The Official Paul Laffoley Website
  - A Beautiful Mind: Paul Laffoley by Ken Johnson for the Boston Globe, Feb 11, 2007
 The Essential Paul Laffoley – The Essential Paul Laffoley by The University of Chicago Press, 2016\
  Paul Laffoley: The Force Structure of the Mystical Experience 2015
  - Paul Laffoley Posters

1935 births
2015 deaths
Brown University alumni
Visionary artists
Outsider artists
Philosophers of art
Architectural theoreticians
20th-century American architects
American architecture writers
American male non-fiction writers
American diarists
American non-fiction environmental writers
American technology writers
Harvard Graduate School of Design alumni
Futurologists
Modernist architects
Solar building designers
High-tech architecture
Organic architecture
Sustainability advocates
American contemporary painters
20th-century American painters
American male painters
21st-century American painters
20th-century American non-fiction writers
American amputees
20th-century American male writers
20th-century American male artists